Ricardo Paredes Romero (1898–1979), was an Ecuadorian medical doctor, writer, naturalist, social scientist, and politician.

Romero founded the Socialist Party – Broad Front of Ecuador.

1898 births
1979 deaths
Ecuadorian physicians
Ecuadorian male writers
Socialist Party – Broad Front of Ecuador politicians
20th-century physicians